Yemen participated at the 2018 Summer Youth Olympics in Buenos Aires, Argentina from 6 October to 18 October 2018.

Athletics

Judo

Individual

Team

References

You
Nations at the 2018 Summer Youth Olympics
Yemen at the Youth Olympics